Erysipelas is a relatively common bacterial infection of the superficial layer of the skin (upper dermis), extending to the superficial lymphatic vessels within the skin, characterized by a raised, well-defined, tender, bright red rash, typically on the face or legs, but which can occur anywhere on the skin. It is a form of cellulitis and is potentially serious.

Erysipelas is usually caused by the bacteria Streptococcus pyogenes, also known as group A β-hemolytic streptococci, which enters the body through a break in the skin, such as a scratch or an insect bite. It is more superficial than cellulitis, and is typically more raised and demarcated. The term comes from the Greek ἐρυσίπελας (erysípelas), meaning "red skin".

In animals, erysipelas is a disease caused by infection with the bacterium Erysipelothrix rhusiopathiae. The disease caused in animals is called Diamond Skin Disease, which occurs especially in pigs. Heart valves and skin are affected. Erysipelothrix rhusiopathiae can also infect humans, but in that case, the infection is known as erysipeloid.

Signs and symptoms
Symptoms often occur suddenly. Affected individuals may develop a fever, shivering, chills, fatigue, headaches, vomiting and be generally unwell within 48 hours of the initial infection. The red plaque enlarges rapidly and has a sharply demarcated, raised edge. It may appear swollen, feel firm, warm and tender to touch and may have a consistency similar to orange peel. Pain may be extreme.

More severe infections can result in vesicles (pox or insect bite-like marks), blisters, and petechiae (small purple or red spots), with possible skin necrosis (death). Lymph nodes may be swollen, and lymphedema may occur. Occasionally, a red streak extending to the lymph node can be seen.

The infection may occur on any part of the skin, including the face, arms, fingers, legs and toes; it tends to favour the extremities. The umbilical stump and sites of lymphoedema are also common sites affected.

Fat tissue and facial areas, typically around the eyes, ears, and cheeks, are most susceptible to infection. Repeated infection of the extremities can lead to chronic swelling (lymphoedema).

Cause

Most cases of erysipelas are due to Streptococcus pyogenes, also known as group A β-hemolytic streptococci, less commonly by group C or G streptococci and rarely due to Staphylococcus aureus. Newborns may contract erysipelas due to Streptococcus agalactiae, also known as group B streptococcus or GBS.

The infecting bacteria can enter the skin through minor trauma, human, insect or animal bites, surgical incisions, ulcers, burns and abrasions. There may be underlying eczema or athlete's foot (tinea pedis), and it can originate from streptococci bacteria in the subject's own nasal passages or ear.

The rash is due to an exotoxin, not the Streptococcus bacteria, and is found in areas where no symptoms are present; e.g., the infection may be in the nasopharynx, but the rash is found usually on the epidermis and superficial lymphatics.

Diagnosis
Erysipelas is usually diagnosed by the clinician looking at the characteristic well-demarcated rash following a history of injury or recognition of one of the risk factors.

Tests, if performed, may show a high white cell count, raised CRP or positive blood culture identifying the organism.

Erysipelas must be differentiated from herpes zoster, angioedema, contact dermatitis, erythema chronicum migrans of early Lyme disease, gout, septic arthritis, septic bursitis, vasculitis, allergic reaction to an insect bite, acute drug reaction, deep venous thrombosis and diffuse inflammatory carcinoma of the breast.

Differentiating from cellulitis
Erysipelas can be distinguished from cellulitis by two particular features; its raised advancing edge and its sharp borders. The redness in cellulitis is not raised and its border is relatively indistinct. Bright redness of erysipelas has been described as a third differentiating feature.

Erysipelas does not affect subcutaneous tissue. It does not release pus, only serum or serous fluid. Subcutaneous edema may lead the physician to misdiagnose it as cellulitis.

Treatment
Depending on the severity, treatment involves either oral or intravenous antibiotics, using, among others, penicillins, clindamycin, or erythromycin. While illness symptoms resolve in a day or two, the skin may take weeks to return to normal.
Because of the risk of reinfection, prophylactic antibiotics are sometimes used after resolution of the initial condition.

Prognosis
The disease prognosis includes:
 Spread of infection to other areas of body can occur through the bloodstream (bacteremia), including septic arthritis. Glomerulonephritis can follow an episode of streptococcal erysipelas or other skin infection, but not rheumatic fever.
  of infection: Erysipelas can recur in 18–30% of cases even after antibiotic treatment. A chronic state of recurrent erysipelas infections can occur with several predisposing factors including alcoholism, diabetes, and athlete's foot. Another predisposing factor is chronic cutaneous edema, such as can in turn be caused by venous insufficiency or heart failure.
 Lymphatic damage
 Necrotizing fasciitis, commonly known as "flesh-eating" bacterial infection, is a potentially deadly exacerbation of the infection if it spreads to deeper tissue.

Epidemiology
There is currently no validated recent data on the worldwide incidence of erysipelas. From 2004 to 2005, UK hospitals reported 69,576 cases of cellulitis and 516 cases of erysipelas. One book stated that several studies have placed the prevalence rate between one and 250 in every 10,000 people. The development of antibiotics, as well as increased sanitation standards, has contributed to the decreased rate of incidence. Erysipelas caused systemic illness in up to 40% of cases reported by UK hospitals and 29% of people had recurrent episodes within three years. Anyone can be infected, although incidence rates are higher in infants and elderly. Several studies also reported a higher incidence rate in women. Four out of five cases occur on the legs, although historically the face was a more frequent site.

Risk factors for developing the disease include
 Arteriovenous fistula
 Chronic skin conditions such as psoriasis, athlete's foot, and eczema
 Excising the saphenous vein
 Immune deficiency or compromise, such as
 Diabetes
 Alcoholism
 Obesity
 Human immunodeficiency virus (HIV)
 In newborns, exposure of the umbilical cord and vaccination site injury
 Issues in lymph or blood circulation
 Leg ulcers
 Lymphatic edema
 Lymphatic obstruction
 Lymphoedema
 Nasopharyngeal infection
 Nephrotic syndrome
 Pregnancy
 Previous episode(s) of erysipelas
 Toe web intertrigo
 Traumatic wounds
 Venous insufficiency or disease

Preventative measures 
Individuals can take preventative steps to increase the chance they do not catch the disease. Properly cleaning and covering wounds is important for people battling an open wound. Effectively treating athlete's foot or eczema if they were the cause for the initial infection will decrease the chance of the infection occurring again. People with diabetes should pay attention to maintaining good foot hygiene. It is also important to follow up with doctors to make sure the disease has not come back or spread. About one-third of people who have had erysipelas will be infected again within three years. Rigorous antibiotics may be needed in the case of recurrent bacterial skin infections.

Notable cases 

 In Rodrigo Souza Leão's autobiographical novel All Dogs are Blue, he says that his erysipelas is cured by the antibiotic Benzetacil (Benzathine benzylpenicillin).

History
It was historically known as St. Anthony's fire.

Citations

External links 

Bacterial diseases
Bacterium-related cutaneous conditions